Timora is a genus of moths of the family Noctuidae. Some authors consider it to be a subgenus of Heliothis.

Species
Timora adamsoni Pinhey, 1956
Timora albisticta Janse, 1917
Timora bivittata Walker, 1856
Timora crofti Pinhey, 1956
Timora daphoena Hampson, 1910
Timora diarhoda Hampson, 1909
Timora feildi Erschoff, 1874
Timora ignea Hampson, 1891
Timora margarita Le Cerf, 1911
Timora pauliani Viette, 1961
Timora perrosea de Joannis, 1910
Timora senegalensis Guenée, 1852
Timora showaki Pinhey, 1956
Timora sinuata Moore, 1881
Timora turtur Berio, 1939
Timora umbrifascia Hampson, 1913
Timora unifascia Bethune-Baker, 1911
Timora uniformis Warren, 1913
Timora zavattarii Berio, 1944

References

Heliothinae